SBP may refer to:

Science, medicine and technology
 Sanford Burnham Prebys Medical Discovery Institute
 Scannerless Boolean Parser, a software development tool
 Serial Bus Protocol 2, a computer interconnect specification
 Spontaneous bacterial peritonitis
 SBP-tag (Streptavidin-Binding Peptide-tag), an amino acid sequence
 Solitary bone plasmacytoma, a type of cancer
 Sex steroid-binding protein
Systolic blood pressure, maximum blood pressure during one heartbeat

Schools
 Sekolah Berasrama Penuh, a school system in Malaysia
 Student body president

Organizations
 Samahang Basketbol ng Pilipinas, the national basketball federation of the Philippines
 Society of Business Practitioners, a British professional institute
 St. Bernard Project, a disaster relief organization
 State Bank of Pakistan
 Swatantra Bharat Party, an Indian political party
 The Sunday Business Post, an Irish financial newspaper

Transport
 IATA airport code for San Luis Obispo County Regional Airport in California, US
 National Rail station code for Stonebridge Park station in London, England

Other uses
 SIL International code for Sangu, a language of Tanzania
 Soft Border Patrol, a Northern Irish mockumentary sitcom
 "Sweet but Psycho", a 2018 song by Ava Max